Kogălniceanu or Cogălniceanu may refer to:
 Kogălniceanu family, a Moldavian and Romanian boyar family, whose members include:
 Constantin Kogălniceanu, legislator
 Enache Kogălniceanu, courtier, man of letters, brother of Constantin
 Mihail Kogălniceanu, liberal statesman, lawyer, great-grandson of Constantin
 Vasile Kogălniceanu, agrarian politician, son of Mihail
 Dan Cogălniceanu, actor

See also
 Mihail Kogălniceanu (disambiguation)

Romanian-language surnames